Suno Sasurji is a 2018 Indian  Bhojpuri language action thriller film written and directed by Subbarao Gosangi and produced by Iqbal E. Makani. The film stars Rishabh Kashyap (Golu) and Richa Dixit in leading roles while Awadhesh Mishra, Kiran Yadav, Mehnaaz, Mantu Lal, Tej Bahadur, Surendra Mishra, Gowri Shankar, Vijay Prasad and other in supporting roles.

Cast
Rishabh Kashyap
Richa Dixit
Awadhesh Mishra
Kiran Yadav
Mehnaaz
Mantu Lal
Tej Bahadur
Surendra Mishra
Gowri Shankar
Vijay Prasad

Music
The music of Suno Sasurji is composed by Rajesh Jha with lyrics penned by Pyare Lal Yadav, Manoj Matlabi, Shyam Dehati and Yadav Raj. It is produced under the "Wave Music" Label.

Marketing
Trailer was this movie was released on 22 January 2018 at official YouTube channel of "Wave Music", who also bought his satellite rights.

References

2018 films
2010s Bhojpuri-language films